Dolichognatha junlitjri is a species of orb-weaver spiders found in the Philippines. The species was discovered in Molawin Creek at Mount Makiling, and was described, illustrated and named by Aimee Lynn Barrion-Dupo and Alberto T. Barrion who published their discovery in 2014. They considered that the genus Prolochus, treated a synonym of Dolichognatha by sources such as the World Spider Catalog , should be revived. It would include Dolichognatha longiceps as Prolochus longiceps, and Prolochus junlitjri. However, a molecular phylogenetic study in 2018 did not support this, and placed the species in Dolichognatha, the placement accepted by the World Spider Catalog.

References

Tetragnathidae
Spiders described in 2014
Spiders of Asia